Ilaria Mauro (born 22 May 1988) is a former Italian football striker. She has also played for the Italian national team.

Club career
Mauro spent the first part of her career with UPC Tavagnacco in Italy's Serie A. Following 12 seasons with Tavagnacco, Mauro decided to move abroad in 2013. She signed for SC Sand of the German second division. Two years later she joined 1. FFC Turbine Potsdam of the German Bundesliga.

In 2016, she returned to Italy when joining Fiorentina.

International career
Mauro made her debut for the senior national team on 10 March 2008; a 2–0 win over China at the 2008 edition of the Algarve Cup in Loulé. Her first goal for Italy came against Denmark at UEFA Women's Euro 2013.

Honours

Club
UPC Tavagnacco
 Italian Women's Cup: Winner 2012–13

Fiorentina
 Serie A: Winner 2016–17
 Italian Women's Cup: Winner 2016–17, 2017–18
 Italian Women's Super Cup: Winner 2018

Individual
 AIC Best Women's XI: 2019

References

External links 

 Profile at Football.it
 

1988 births
Living people
Italian women's footballers
Italy women's international footballers
People from Gemona del Friuli
Expatriate women's footballers in Germany
Italian expatriate sportspeople in Germany
Women's association football forwards
Serie A (women's football) players
U.P.C. Tavagnacco players
SC Sand players
1. FFC Turbine Potsdam players
Italian expatriate women's footballers
Fiorentina Women's F.C. players
Inter Milan (women) players
2019 FIFA Women's World Cup players
Footballers from Friuli Venezia Giulia
UEFA Women's Euro 2017 players